Frazier Bridge is a historic Double arched bridge over the La Chute River at Ticonderoga in Essex County, New York.  It was built in 1894 and is a double-arched masonry bridge, 23 feet wide and spanning 50 feet at roughly 10 feet above water level.

It was listed on the National Register of Historic Places in 1998.

Gallery

References

Road bridges on the National Register of Historic Places in New York (state)
Bridges completed in 1894
Bridges in Essex County, New York
National Register of Historic Places in Essex County, New York
Stone arch bridges in the United States